The 2018 USL Cup Playoffs was the  postseason tournament following the 2018 United Soccer League regular season, the fourth since the league rebranded for the 2015 season, and second as a USSF Division II league. Including USL Pro history, it is the seventh postseason tournament. The tournament will begin on the weekend of October 20 and end on November 8.

Sixteen teams (top 8 per conference) will compete in the single elimination tournament. Teams will be seeded one through eight in each conference. The conference semifinal winners will play against each other in the Conference Championship, which will serve as the overall semifinals for the playoff. The winners of the Eastern and Western Conference Championship will play for the USL Cup. The winner of the playoffs will be crowned league champion.

FC Cincinnati clinched the USL regular-season title on September 26th and will be the number one seed in the Eastern Conference.

Conference standings 
The top 8 teams from each conference advance to the USL playoffs.

Eastern Conference

Western Conference

Bracket

Schedule

Conference Quarterfinals

Conference Semifinals

Conference Finals

USL Championship

Championship Game MVP: Luke Spencer (LOU)

Top goalscorers

References 

playoffs
USL Championship Playoffs